Orthophoria is a condition of binocular fixation in which the lines of vision meet at the object toward which they are directed, and considered as a normal condition of balance of the ocular muscles of the two eyes. The condition opposite of Orthophoria, is called heterophoria.

References

Ophthalmology
Vision